Baron Segrave (Seagrave) is a title in the Peerage of England. It was created by writ in 1283 for Nicholas de Segrave, and the title is drawn from a village in Leicestershire now spelled Seagrave.

The 6th Baron Segrave had previously succeeded to the title of Baron Mowbray, and thereafter, the two baronies have remained united, apart from a period of about a hundred years. For several generations they were subsidiary titles of the Dukes of Norfolk, and in 1777, they both went into abeyance with the death of the 9th Duke of Norfolk.

The second creation, by writ was for Nicholas de Segrave of Barton Segrave in the County of Northampton in 1295, becoming extinct on the death of his daughter Maud in 1335.

In 1831, a new Barony of Segrave was granted to Colonel William Berkeley, later created first Earl FitzHardinge, but this creation became extinct when he died without an heir in 1857.

Despite this interlude, the original barony of Segrave was still in existence, and in 1878, it was called out of abeyance for Alfred Stourton, 23rd Baron Mowbray, some two weeks after he had similarly recovered the barony of Mowbray. The titles have remained united since.

Barons Segrave, of Segrave (1283)
Nicholas Segrave, 1st Baron Segrave (d. 1295)
John Segrave, 2nd Baron Segrave (1256–1325)
Stephen Segrave, 3rd Baron Segrave (d. 1326)
John Segrave, 4th Baron Segrave (1315–1353)
Elizabeth Segrave, 5th Baroness Segrave (d. 1375, or bef. 1368, or c. 1399)
John de Mowbray, 1st Earl of Nottingham, 6th Baron Segrave (1365–1379)
Thomas de Mowbray, 1st Duke of Norfolk, 7th Baron Segrave (1366-1399)
Thomas de Mowbray, 4th Earl of Norfolk, 8th Baron Segrave (1385-1405)
John Mowbray, 2nd Duke of Norfolk, 9th Baron Segrave (1392-1432)
John Mowbray, 3rd Duke of Norfolk, 10th Baron Segrave (1415–1461)
John Mowbray, 4th Duke of Norfolk, 11th Baron Segrave (1444–1476)
Anne Mowbray, 8th Countess of Norfolk, 12th Baroness Segrave (1472–1481)
In abeyance
John Howard, 1st Duke of Norfolk, 13th Baron Segrave, c. 1425–1485
Forfeit
For further Barons Segrave, see Baron Mowbray.

Barons Segrave, of Barton Segrave  (1295)
Nicholas de Segrave, 1st Baron (d. 1321)
Maude de Bohun, 2nd Baroness (d, 1335)

Barons Segrave, of Berkley Castle (1831)
William Berkeley, 1st Earl FitzHardinge (1786-1857), created Baron Segrave of Berkeley Castle in the County of Gloucester in 1831

References

Burkes Peerage

 
1295 establishments in England
Baronies in the Peerage of England
Baronies by writ
Extinct baronies in the Peerage of the United Kingdom
Noble titles created in 1295
Noble titles created in 1831
Noble titles created for UK MPs